Hajar Abyad (also spelled Hajar al-Abyad) is a village in northern Syria located west of Homs in the Homs Governorate. According to the Syria Central Bureau of Statistics, Hajar Abyad had a population of 351 in the 2004 census. Its inhabitants are predominantly Alawites.

References

Populated places in Talkalakh District
Alawite communities in Syria